Roberta Geremicca (born 1984, in Naples, Italy) is an Italian actress. She moved from Naples to the capital city, Rome, to study acting at 18 years old after graduating from high school. She worked in theatre with Augusto Zucchi  and Silvana Bosi.
She worked as a principal actress for the Accademia dell'Immagine dell' Aquilla, for many years, before having her first guest star roles in soap operas like Un Posto Al Sole and in the TV program Uno Mattina, both produced by RAI.
After theatre and TV she decided to move into film and got a small role in the movie La Voce do Augusto Zucchi.
From Italy she moved to the UK, where she worked in commercials and on stage again  while studying English and the different accents trying to be ready for the next big step: Los Angeles, where she currently lives, works and studies at Stella Adler Studio of Acting.

Winner of the BFA monthly competition for February 2013 in the UK as best international actress,  and 3rd-place winner as best actress for acting competition by indi.com.

External links
IMDb Official page

References

Italian television actresses
1984 births
Living people